Jay Mosley is an American politician serving as a member of the Missouri House of Representatives from the 68th district. Elected in November 2016, he assumed office in January 2017.

Early life and education 
Mosley was born and raised in Sacramento, California. After graduating from Rio Linda High School, he earned a Bachelor of Science degree in leisure studies and therapeutic recreation from Grambling State University.

Career 
From 2004 to 2009, Mosley served as a firefighter in Berkeley, California. Since 2012, he has worked as a shuttle driver. Mosley was elected to the Missouri House of Representatives in November 2016 and assumed office in January 2017. In the 2021–2022 legislative session, Mosely is the ranking member on the Consent and House Procedure Committee.

Electoral history

State Representative

References 

Living people
Year of birth missing (living people)
Politicians from Sacramento, California
Grambling State University alumni
Democratic Party members of the Missouri House of Representatives
African-American state legislators in Missouri
21st-century African-American people